Juyong Pass is a mountain pass located in the Changping District of Beijing Municipality, over  from central Beijing. The Great Wall of China passes through, and the Cloud Platform was built here in the year 1342.

Mountain pass

Geography
Juyongguan (pass) is in the -long Guangou Valley. The pass is one of the three greatest mountain passes of the Great Wall of China. The other two are Jiayuguan and Shanhaiguan (passes).  Juyongguan Pass has two 'sub-passes,' one at the valley's south and the other at the north. The southern one is called "Nan (pass)" and the northern is called "Badaling".

History
The pass had many different names during former Chinese dynasties. However, the name "Juyongguan" was used by more than three dynasties. It was first used in the Qin Dynasty when Emperor Qinshihuang ordered the building of the Great Wall. Juyongguan pass was connected to the Great Wall in the Southern and Northern Dynasties era.

The present pass route was built in the Ming Dynasty and received much renovation later. It was a very important strategic place connecting the inner land and the area near the northern border of China. It was also used to defend the ancient city of Beijing.

Cloud Platform

History
In the middle of the Juyongguan (pass) and Guangou Valley, there is the Cloud Platform gate, also known as the "Crossing Street Tower". There were originally three white pagodas atop the platform, giving it the name of "Crossing Street Tower". They were each destroyed in the transitional period between the late Yuan and early Ming Dynasties. In the early Ming Dynasty, a Buddhist Tai'an Temple hall was built on the platform. It was destroyed in 1702 during the Qing Dynasty.

Platform
The Yuan era Cloud Platform remains. Around the top of the platform are elements such as stone balustrades and a watch post. They remain in the original Yuan style.  On the platform are carvings of Buddhist figures and symbols, as well as Buddhist texts written in six languages and scripts:
 Sanskrit in Lanydza script, Tibetan script, 'Phags-pa script, Old Uyghur script, Tangut script and Chinese characters
 Tibetan language in Tibetan script
 Mongolian language in 'Phags-pa script
 Old Uyghur language in Old Uyghur script
 Tangut language in Tangut script
 Chinese language in Chinese characters

Portal
In the middle of the platform's base there is an arched portal - where people, carts, horsemen, and palanquins could pass through. Many images of people and animals were carved inside the arched gate tunnel and around the portal.

See also 
 Juyongguan railway station
 Operation Chahar
 Chinese architecture

External links 

 Great Wall at JuYongGuan — Photo Gallery

Great Wall of China
Mountain passes of China
Landforms of Beijing
Buildings and structures in Beijing
Tourist attractions in Beijing
Changping District